Lai is a common Chinese surname that is pronounced similarly in both Mandarin and Hakka dialects. The meaning of the character used in the Lai (賴) surname is "depend on; trust in; rely on". Conversely the words, 无赖 literally translated to "without Lai" which means "undependable, rascal or scoundrel".

It is also a Hokkien (Southern Fujian)/ Minnan (Southern Min) surname that is romanized as Lua, Nai or Nua.  In Malaysia, Singapore, Philippines and other parts of South East Asia there are Lai migrants from southern Fujian Province who are usually surnamed Lua/ Luah, Loa (romanized from Hokkien / Minnan in Southern Min dialect) or  Lye (romanized from Hakka dialect) for the Hakka dialect groups.

In Indonesia, most of the Indonesians of Chinese descent changed their surname to an Indonesian surname to comply with 'Cabinet Presidium Decision 127 of 1966' laws during President Suharto's despotic rule. However, they usually change to surnames with the same sound or a surname which contains a part of the original surname, hence the Indonesian Lai surname has evolved into Laya, Lais, or Lasuki.

Origins 

The Lais' ancestry were from the State of Lai (賴國) at the beginning of the ancient Zhou Dynasty (1046 BC). The area is now around Huangchuan County, Henan province.

Marquis Shu Ying (叔穎) was the 19th son of King Wen of Zhou (widely considered to be the founder of the ancient Zhou Dynasty).  He was conferred the heritable title of Hou (侯) or Marquis to rule over a territory which is approximately in the northeast of the present day Baoxin town (包信鎮) in Xi Xian (息縣) of Henan province. This was the reward from King Wu of Zhou, his elder brother (the first King of Zhou Dynasty, reign 1046–1043 BC ) for his assistance in defeating King Zhou of Shang and thereby terminating the ancient Shang dynasty.  Marquis Shu Ying named his domain the State of Lai (賴國) .

Marquis Shu Ying and his succeeding descendants continued to rule the State of Lai well until the year 538 B.C when it was conquered by King Ling of Chu (reign 540–529 BC).  Many Lais were dispersed to the south during their defeat by the Chu state; some changed their surname to escape persecution.  As in the case of those who fled to the neighboring states of Luo (羅) and Fu (傅), some adopted the Luo (or Loh) or Fu (or Poh, Po) surname. (Because of this, the Lai, the Fu and the Luo are closely related).

Others migrated north and settled in Da Yan (Yanling County, Henan).  Most of them adopted the surname Lai (賴) to commemorate their old state.

Statistics 

The largest Lai (賴) clans are in China, Taiwan, Malaysia, Singapore and Philippines .  Majority of the overseas Lai (賴) clans are of the Hakka people followed by the Hokkien/Minnan people.

According to 2010 data, people with surname Lai (賴) ranked 98th most populous in China. The total Lai (賴) population is approximately 0.18% or around 2.4 million people out of China's population of 1.338 billion in 2010. In Taiwan, the surname Lai (賴) is ranked 19th most populous in 2007.

Notable people surnamed Lai (賴)

Politicians and public officeholders
 Lai In-jaw, President of the Judicial Yuan and Chief Justice of the Constitutional Court of the Republic of China (2007–2010)
 Lai Ruoyu, Governor of Shanxi province, China from 1951 to 1952
 Lai Shin-yuan, Minister of Mainland Affairs Council of the Republic of China (2008–2012)
 Loa Sek Hie, Indonesian-Chinese colonial politician, parliamentarian and founding Voorzitter or chairman of the Indon ethnic-Chinese self-defense force Pao An Tui (1946–1949)
 Rai Hau-min, President of Judicial Yuan of the Republic of China (2010–2016)
 William Lai, Vice President of the Republic of China
 Lai Siu Chiu (賴秀珠) : First woman to serve as a Judicial Commissioner and as a judge on the Supreme Court of Singapore .
 Lai Minhua, Former Commissioner of Macau Customs
 Lai Feng-wei, Magistrate-elect of Penghu County

Military
 Lai Wenguang (賴文光) : prominent military leader of the Taiping Rebellion and Nian Rebellion. Brother-in-law of Hong Xiuquan, the leader of the Taiping Rebellion.
 Lai Enjue (赖恩爵): Qing dynasty General and Admiral of the Guangdong Navy.  Fought the British in the Battle of Kowloon during the First Opium War of 1839. Appointed as the Admiral (水师提督) of the Guangdong Navy in 1843.
 Lai Chuanzhu  (赖传珠): Highly decorated Veteran of the Second Sino-Japanese War (1936–1945) and the Chinese Civil War. He was also the General in charge of Landing Operation on Hainan Island together with General Deng Hua.

Academics, Literary  and Arts 
 Loa Ho (賴和) (1894–1943): Taiwanese poet, medical doctor and anti-Japanese Occupation political activist, hailed as the "Father of Modern Taiwanese Literature"
Michael M. C. Lai (賴明詔) : Taiwanese virologist, acknowledged as "father of coronavirus research"
Lai Kui Fang (賴桂芳) : Singaporean artist who worked in France

Entertainment and sports
 Lai Caiqin (born 1966), Chinese badminton player. Gold medalist - World Cup (1990, women doubles), Uber Cup (1990, women team) and Asian Games (1990, women team)
 Shevon Jemie Lai, (赖洁敏).  Malaysian professional badminton player, Gold medalist : Mixed Team Event - World Junior Championships (2011) and Asia Junior Championships (2009)
 Lai Pei Jing, (赖沛君) Malaysian professional badminton player, Gold medalist : Mixed team event -  Glasgow Commonwealth Games (2014) and Asian Junior Championships (2009)
 Lai Runming: Chinese weightlifter, 1984 Olympic Games silver medalist in Men's 56 kg
 Stan Lai: Taiwanese playwright and theater director
 Lai Pi-hsia (賴碧霞) : Famous musician known for performing Hakka hill songs
 Lai Kuan-lin: Republic of China singer and actor, former member of disbanded group WANNA ONE
 Lai Meiyun: Chinese singer, S.I.N.G and Rocket Girls 101 member
 Lai Pin-yu: Taiwanese cosplayer

Other fields
 Pinky Lai (賴平): Chinese car designer and ex-chief designer with Porsche AG
 David Jung-Hsin Lai (賴榮信): Bishop of the Episcopal Diocese of Taiwan
 Lai Afong (赖阿芳): considered to be the most significant Chinese photographer of the nineteenth century
 Lai Ning (赖宁): teenager celebrated as a martyr after his death fighting a wildfire in China

As a European surname
 Ubaldo Lay (1917-1984): Italian actor (born as Ubaldo Bussa, chose his mother's surname for his stagename), notorious for playing the main character of Tenente Sheridan ("Lieutenant Sheridan") in the television series "Giallo Club. Invito al Poliziesco"
 Francis Lai (1932–2018): French composer of Sardinian descent (Ozieri), Academy and Golden Globe Award winner
 Valentino Lai (born 1984): Italian-Swedish football player from Cagliari

See also 
 Lí (黎) (surname) – in Hong Kong, the Chinese surname 黎 is romanized as Lai which is a different surname.

References

Chinese-language surnames
Individual Chinese surnames
Sardinian language
Sardinian culture